Ivan Garelov (born 6 February 1943) is a popular Bulgarian journalist and television presenter.

Biography 
Garelov is a graduate of Sofia University, where he studied journalism. Since 1972, he has been part of the BNT staff. He was for a long time the host of the show "Panorama" (Bulgarian: "Панорама") before being succeeded by Boyko Vasilev. Garelov has also worked at Nova TV and BTV. Between October 2013 and June 2014, he was the co-anchor of TV7's show "The Original" (Bulgarian: "Оригиналът") (together with Elena Yoncheva).

Garelov is married to BNR journalist Donka Stamboliyska and they have two children. He is recognized for being a dedicated educator when it comes to young journalists.

References 

Living people
1943 births
Bulgarian journalists
People from Pazardzhik Province
Sofia University alumni